is a railway station on the Iida Line in the city of Iida,  Nagano Prefecture, Japan, operated by Central Japan Railway Company (JR Central).

Lines
Ina-Yawata Station is served by the Iida Line and is 123.6 kilometers from the starting point of the line at Toyohashi Station.

Station layout
The station consists of two ground-level opposed side platforms connected by a level crossing. The station is unattended.

Platforms

Adjacent stations

History
Ina-Yawata Station opened on 17 December 1926. With the privatization of Japanese National Railways (JNR) on 1 April 1987, the station came under the control of JR Central.

Passenger statistics
In fiscal 2015, the station was used by an average of 223 passengers daily (boarding passengers only).

Surrounding area
 Iida City Hospital

Iida Women's Junior College

See also
 List of railway stations in Japan

References

External links

 Ina-Yawata Station information 

Railway stations in Nagano Prefecture
Railway stations in Japan opened in 1926
Stations of Central Japan Railway Company
Iida Line
Iida, Nagano